The Department of Industry, Innovation, Science, Research and Tertiary Education was an Australian government department that existed between December 2011 and March 2013.

Scope
Information about the department's functions and/or government funding allocation could be found in the Administrative Arrangements Orders, the annual Portfolio Budget Statements, in the department's annual reports and on the Department's website.

At its creation, the department was responsible for the following:
Manufacturing and commerce including industry and market development 
Industry innovation policy and technology diffusion 
Promotion of industrial research and development, and commercialisation 
Biotechnology, excluding gene technology regulation 
Marketing of manufactures and services 
Enterprise improvement 
Construction industry 
Small business policy and implementation 
Business entry point management 
Facilitation of the development of service industries generally 
Trade marks, plant breeders’ rights and patents of inventions and designs 
Country of origin labelling 
Weights and measures standards 
Civil space issues Analytical laboratory services 
Science policy 
Promotion of collaborative research in science and technology 
Co-ordination of research policy 
Creation and development of research infrastructure 
Commercialisation and utilisation of public sector research relating to portfolio programs and agencies 
Research grants and fellowships 
Information and communications technology industry development 
Food industry policy 
Training, including apprenticeships and training and assessment services 
Support for introduction of a national occupation licensing system 
Higher education, skills and vocational education policy and programs 
Indigenous higher education and vocational training 
Policy, coordination and support for international education 
Income support policies and programs for students and apprentices

Structure
The department was an Australian Public Service department, staffed by officials who were responsible to the Minister for Tertiary Education, Skills, Science and Research, Chris Evans (December 2011 to February 2013) and Chris Bowen (February 2014 to March 2013) and the Minister for Industry and Innovation and Minister for Climate Change and Energy Efficiency, Greg Combet.

References

Australia, Industry, Innovation, Science, Research and Tertiary Education
Industry, Innovation, Science, Research and Tertiary Education